Group Sex is the debut studio album by American hardcore punk band Circle Jerks. It was released on October 1, 1980, by Frontier Records. The album consists of 14 songs in 15 minutes and is considered to be a landmark album in hardcore punk. It was included in the book 1001 Albums You Must Hear Before You Die.

Background
The recording sessions for Group Sex took place in July 1980 at Byrdcliffe Studios in Culver City, California.

Four songs on the album – "Wasted", "Don't Care", "Behind the Door" and "Red Tape" – were originally co-written and performed by vocalist Keith Morris with his previous band Black Flag. "Wasted" had appeared on Black Flag's 1979 extended play Nervous Breakdown. "Don't Care" was recorded during an early recording session for what was supposed to be Black Flag's debut studio album. After Morris left Black Flag, the tapes were shelved. Black Flag's version of "Don't Care" later appeared on the 1982 compilation album Everything Went Black. "Behind the Door" was re-written and released as "Room 13" on Black Flag's 1981 debut studio album, Damaged. Morris and Circle Jerks drummer Lucky Lehrer collaborated on the arrangement of "Red Tape". In a nod to the latter's background as a jazz musician, the jazz principle of "trading fours" was co-opted by Lehrer in an effort to expand the narrow range of musicality that existed at the time in hardcore punk.

When Morris recorded and released "I Don't Care" with the Circle Jerks (without crediting Black Flag guitarist Greg Ginn, who composed the music), Black Flag responded by rewriting the lyrics, and then recording and releasing the song as "You Bet We've Got Something Personal Against You!" for the Jealous Again 12" EP, which was also released in 1980.

"Live Fast Die Young" is a reworking with new lyrics by Morris of "Cover Band", a song written and composed by Circle Jerks guitarist Greg Hetson for his previous band, Redd Kross, who recorded it for their 1980 EP Red Cross.

Some CD versions feature the album twice given its short run time. The back cover acknowledges this simply as "program repeats" at the end of the track list.

Artwork
The image used for the cover art of Group Sex is a stylized version by graphic designer Diane Zincavage of a photo taken by punk photographer Ed Colver after a Circle Jerks/Adolescents performance at the Marina del Rey Skatepark. Morris had seen Colver in the audience, and after the show, gathered the members of the crowd into the bowl of the skate park and asked Colver to take a picture. The photo features Casey Royer of the Adolescents; Circle Jerks bassist Roger Rogerson and his girlfriend at the time, Laura Bennett; and various other people of the California hardcore punk scene, two of them wearing Public Image Ltd shirts. Other audience members not appearing in the photo included Darby Crash and Lorna Doom of the Germs, Phoenix (aka Madame Jade),as well as Germs manager Rob Henley. Legendary skater Tony Hawk was present at the skatepark that night, but left just before the photo was taken.

Reception

Group Sex was met with generally positive reviews and ratings, and the album has been called a classic of the hardcore punk genre. Mark Deming of AllMusic rated the album 4 out of 5 stars and stated, "As such things go, it's tight, reasonably well played, the songs kinda sorta have hooks, and Keith Morris is a pretty good frontman, but if you're looking for nuance, you're pretty much out of luck. Then again, if you were looking for nuance in a Circle Jerks album, you've obviously been misinformed as to how this punk rock stuff works".

Robert Christgau gave it a "B+" (one of his highest ratings at the time) saying, "Like the Angry Samoans, although not as clearly or catchily, these slammers double-time metal riffs behind the rants, yielding such indelible plaints as "Deny Everything" ("I'm being framed"), "Paid Vacation" ("It's Afghanistan!"), and "Group Sex" (sensitive reading from the personals plus screaming title chorus)".

Legacy
In November 2019, plans for a tour to celebrate the 40th anniversary of Group Sex were announced. The tour was scheduled to begin in 2020 and would feature the line-up of Keith Morris, Greg Hetson, Zander Schloss along with Queens of the Stone Age drummer Joey Castillo. This tour would mark the band's first performances since they went on hiatus in 2011.The tour was postponed until September 2021 due to the COVID-19 pandemic.In April 2022, six of the dates on their 40th anniversary tour were postponed due to Morris testing positive for the COVID-19 virus.

Track listing

Personnel

Personnel
 Keith Morris – lead vocals
 Greg Hetson – guitar
 Roger Rogerson – bass
 Lucky Lehrer – drums

Production
 Cary Markoff; Circle Jerks – production
 Cliff Zellman – engineering
 Ben Lesko; Ken Lauber – assistant engineers
 Frank DeLuna – mastering
 Diane Zincavage – graphic design
 Shawn Kerri – illustration (inner sleeve comic strip)
 Doug Drug – illustration, band logo
 Ed Colver – photography
 Mackie Osborne – new layout (1997 CD reissue)

Notes

References

External links

Group Sex (Adobe Flash) at Radio3Net (streamed copy where licensed)

1980 debut albums
Circle Jerks albums
Frontier Records albums